Ahad Azam (born 14 January 1992) is an Druze-Israeli association footballer currently playing for Bnei Eilat.

Career

Club 
Azam grew up in the Hapoel Haifa youth academy. He made his debut with the senior team on 4 December 2011.

On 9 September 2014 moved to Hapoel Ironi Kiryar Shmona. After one season backed to Hapoel Haifa.

Statistics

References

External links

1992 births
Living people
Israeli footballers
Druze sportspeople
Hapoel Haifa F.C. players
Hapoel Ironi Kiryat Shmona F.C. players
Hapoel Bnei Lod F.C. players
F.C. Haifa Robi Shapira players
Maccabi Ironi Kiryat Ata F.C. players
Maccabi Ahi Nazareth F.C. players
Maccabi Ironi Tirat HaCarmel F.C. players
Maccabi Ironi Tamra F.C. players
Bnei Eilat F.C. players
Israeli Premier League players
Liga Leumit players
Israeli Druze
Arab-Israeli footballers
Arab citizens of Israel
Israel under-21 international footballers
Footballers from Shefa-'Amr
Association football midfielders